Grownups is a BBC Three sitcom written by Susan Nickson, who also created hit BBC Three sitcom Two Pints of Lager and a Packet of Crisps. It follows the trials and tribulations of a group of twentysomething friends in Manchester, facing the decision to either carry on partying or settle down.

The first episode aired on 7 May 2006 on BBC Three and appeared at number eight on the Broadcasters' Audience Research Board (BARB) top ten of most watched BBC Three programmes for that week. The show made only one more entry on the chart for the rest of the first series, when it reached number nine, some two weeks later.

A second series was produced, with studio recordings taking place between May and July 2007. The first two episodes aired back-to-back on BBC Three on Sunday 5 August. Unlike the first series, the second series displayed more adult humour, including more intense sexual references.

The first episode of the second series appeared at number eight in the BARB weekly top ten for BBC Three, with the second episode which aired immediately afterward, at number nine.
A third series was commissioned by the BBC and tickets to see live filming went on sale on the official BBC Tickets website in September 2008. The first episode of the third series aired 13 January 2009.

Characters
Michelle Booth (Sheridan Smith) is the central character of the show. She is a 27-year-old nutritionist who lives in the trendy Northern Quarter of Manchester. Despite her job, Michelle's life is a contradiction, because she is passionate about alcohol, squirty cream, and her favourite food, Flumps.
Claire Finnerty (2006–2007) (Fiona Wass) is Michelle's best mate – a beautician. She is very wild and loves biting men. From her behaviour towards both genders, she could be either bisexual or she could be just a single young woman willing to experiment, flirt, and have fun with both genders before settling down.
Grant Grant (Steven Meo) has fancied Michelle for years, and is always wondering why she has not gone for his Welsh charms. He is a solicitor, sensitive, smart, he has a large obsession with Judge John Deed.
Mike Booth (2006) (Rob Rouse) is Michelle's brother, who lives with her after being kicked out of his parents' house in the first episode. He is a DJ and has a strange obsession with singing the song he wrote: "DJ Mike, making love to you every night."

Dean Adewale (2006) (O. T. Fagbenle) is the new man in Michelle's life, although he worries that Michelle is not into commitment.
Chris (2007–2009) (Richard Mylan) replaced Mike as Michelle's flatmate. They know each other from university and he is studying for a PhD. Is apparently extremely well endowed, having compared his penis to a can of Red Bull and his testicles to Ribena berries on anabolic steroids.

Rachel (2007) (Naomi Bentley) is Michelle and Claire's boss. She is very rich and just as mental. Her dialogue (and very male growl) suggest that she could be a transsexual.
Alex Salade (2007–2009) (Warren Brown) is a barman at Bar Salade where the cast often go out for social drinking. Alex removes his shirt at every given opportunity, going as far as creating reasons; for instance, deliberately spilling a drink and being "forced" to mop it up with his shirt. He has a huge  ego (when Chris tried to fight with Alex, he replied: "I wouldn't do that. You see, I'm really, really, really, really, really hard ... and hot.").
Jenny (2009) (Leah MacRae) is a barmaid who works alongside Alex in Bar Salade, described as Michelle's best friend. Alex fancies Jenny, but Jenny fancies Grant.

Critical reception
The British Comedy Guide gave the show a negative review, stating " Grownups is as far, far away from being able to be called a good sitcom as is possible" and criticised the show for having "wooden setups and weak jokes".

Episodes

Series 1 (2006)

Series 2 (2007)

Series 3 (2009)

Two Pints: Comic Relief Special 2009 

The cast of Two Pints of Lager and a Packet of Crisps, Grownups, and Coming of Age, starred in the first episode of the eighth series of Two Pints for Comic Relief.
All of the regular cast from all three shows appeared. The episode was sub-titled "When Janet Met Michelle". Sheridan Smith (who played Michelle in Grownups and Janet in Two Pints of Lager) appeared in both roles, by use of camera tricks and a body double.

References

External links
 
Grownups official BBC site

2006 British television series debuts
2009 British television series endings
2000s British teen sitcoms
BBC television sitcoms
BBC high definition shows
Television shows set in Manchester
English-language television shows